Chou Tai-ying (born 16 August 1963) is a Taiwanese female association football coach and former player. She is considered the most successful Taiwanese footballer so far.

Career
She was Chinese Taipei's key player in the 1980s and early 1990s, winning three AFC Women's Championships (1977, 1979, 1981) and two OFC Women's Championships (1986, 1989). She was also one of the few Taiwanese players who have played for foreign professional clubs. In 1987, she joined the  German football club SV Bergisch Gladbach 09 and won two championships. She joined Suzuyo Shimizu F.C. Ladies of Japanese L. League in 1989, in which Shimizu F.C. Ladies won the first league season title and Chou herself scored 12 goals, making her the Golden Boot winner and member of Best XI. She retired from player career after 1994 Asian Games.

She was the captain of Chinese Taipei women's national football team at the inaugural 1991 FIFA Women's World Cup. The team reached the quarter finals before being beaten 7–0 by eventual winners United States.

In 2005, Chou took over as the head coach of Chinese Taipei women's national football team.

Honours
With Chinese Taipei women's national football team
AFC Women's Championship: 1977, 1979, 1981
AFC Women's Championship MVP: 1979
OFC Women's Championship: 1986, 1989

With Shimizu F.C. Ladies
L. League: 1989
L. League top scorer: 1989

References

1963 births
Living people
Chinese Taipei women's international footballers
Chinese Taipei women's national football team managers
Expatriate women's footballers in Japan
Expatriate women's footballers in Germany
Female association football managers
Nadeshiko League players
Suzuyo Shimizu FC Lovely Ladies players
Taiwanese expatriate footballers
Taiwanese expatriate sportspeople in Japan
Taiwanese expatriate sportspeople in Germany
Taiwanese football managers
Taiwanese women's footballers
1991 FIFA Women's World Cup players
Women's association football midfielders
Asian Games medalists in football
Asian Games bronze medalists for Chinese Taipei
Footballers at the 1990 Asian Games
Footballers at the 1994 Asian Games
Medalists at the 1994 Asian Games